Cumberland House Cree Nation ( kâ-ministiko-minahikoskâhk, meaning Island that's in a pine forest) is a Swampy Cree First Nations band government in Saskatchewan, Canada. Their reserves include:

 Budd's Point 20D
 Cumberland House Cree Nation 20
 Muskeg River 20C
 Pine Bluff 20A
 Pine Bluff 20B

References

External links

First Nations in Saskatchewan
Swampy Cree